Avalanche lily is a common name for several plants in the genus Erythronium and may refer to:

Erythronium grandiflorum, with yellow flowers
Erythronium montanum, with white flowers